The Temple of Salus  was an sanctuary in Ancient Rome dedicated to the goddess Salus.  The temple was founded by Gaius Junius Bubulcus in 306-303 BC.  If still in use by the 4th-century, it would have been closed during the persecution of pagans in the late Roman Empire.

See also
List of Ancient Roman temples

References

Roman temples by deity
4th-century BC religious buildings and structures